Ye Horns Inn is a restaurant and public house at Horns Lane in Goosnargh parish near Preston, Lancashire, England.

Located near the Forest of Bowland, Ye Horns Inn has welcomed locals and travellers alike over the years. Originally a coaching inn called the Buck Horns, dating back to 1782, it was originally part of a working farm.

During the inter-war period the interior was partially refitted which coincided with render and mock timber being applied to the exterior. This, and the creation of dining rooms, is thought to be an attempt to provide an "improved" pub, popular at the time and stemming from a desire to cut back on the amount of drunkenness associated with conventional Victorian and Edwardian public houses.

Fast forward a few decades and the building was granted a Grade II listing in January 2017 based on its architectural value and the retention of the pub’s interior. Its distinctive characteristics, prior to renovation 2018–2022, earned it a listing on the Campaign for Real Ale's National Inventory of Historic Pub Interiors. It was one of only three pubs in the UK where the public could sit behind the bar in the area from which the bar staff serve. However, the Campaign for Real Ale claims that the renovations from 2018 to 2022 appear to have damaged historic parts of the interior without listed building consent.

See also

Listed buildings in Goosnargh

References

National Inventory Pubs
Pubs in Lancashire
Buildings and structures in the City of Preston
1782 establishments in England
Goosnargh

Restaurants in the United Kingdom